Efstratios "Stratos" Perperoglou (Greek: Στράτος Περπέρογλου; born August 7, 1984) is a Greek former professional basketball player. He is 2.03 m (6'8") tall and he played mainly at the small forward position.

Professional career
Perperoglou began his playing career with the youth clubs of AO Kavalas and Iviskos. He started his professional career with Ilysiakos in 2002, and then he moved to Panionios in 2004. In 2007, he transferred from Panionios to the big Greek EuroLeague club Panathinaikos.

With Panathinaikos, Perperoglou won 4 Greek League championships (2008, 2009, 2010, 2011) and 3 Greek Cups (2008, 2009, 2012). He also won 2 EuroLeague titles (2009, 2011), and the Triple Crown with Panathinaikos, in 2009.

In August 2012, he signed a two-year contract with Olympiacos. With Olympiacos, he won the 2012–13 season championship of the EuroLeague. He also won the 2013 edition of the FIBA Intercontinental Cup.

On June 18, 2014, he signed a two-year deal with Anadolu Efes. 
On July 23, 2015, he left Efes and signed a two-year deal with FC Barcelona Lassa.

On September 21, 2017, he signed with Israeli club Hapoel Jerusalem for the 2017–18 season.

On August 3, 2018, Perperoglou moved to Serbia and signed for Crvena zvezda for the 2018–19 season. Also, he played the 2019–20 season for the Zvezda.

In July 2021, Perperoglou announced his retirement from his basketball career at age 36.

National team career

Greece junior national team
Perperoglou won bronze medals with Greece junior national teams at both the 2002 FIBA Europe Under-18 Championship and the 2003 FIBA Under-19 World Cup. He also played at the 2004 FIBA Europe Under-20 Championship.

Greece men's national team
Perperoglou has also played with the Greece men's national basketball team, and they won the bronze medal at the 2009 EuroBasket. He also represented Greece at the 2010 FIBA World Championship, the 2013 EuroBasket, the 2015 EuroBasket, and the 2016 Turin FIBA World Olympic Qualifying Tournament.

Personal life
Perperoglou is married to former WNBA player Erin Buescher Perperoglou.

Career statistics

EuroLeague

|-
| style="text-align:left;"| 2007–08
| style="text-align:left;" rowspan=5| Panathinaikos
| 9 || 4 || 9.9 || .485 || .250 || .333 || 1.4 || .7 || .3 || .1 || 3.9 || 3.1
|-
| style="text-align:left;background:#AFE6BA;"| 2008–09†
| 21 || 19 || 18.2 || .457 || .325 || .783 || 2.4 || 1.0 || 1.0 || .3 || 5.5 || 5.8
|-
| style="text-align:left;"| 2009–10
| 15 || 14 || 20.7 || .516 || .500 || .846 || 1.9 || 1.2 || 1.8 || .3 || 6.1 || 7.1
|-
| style="text-align:left;background:#AFE6BA;"| 2010–11†
| 22 || 11 || 18.3 || .424 || .404 || .685 || 2.3 || 0.7 || .5 || .3 || 7.1 || 5.8
|-
| style="text-align:left;"| 2011–12
| 11 || 5 || 15.5 || .395 || .333 || .500 || 1.5 || 0.7 || .4 || .2 || 3.7 || 1.6
|-
| style="text-align:left;background:#AFE6BA;"| 2012–13†
| style="text-align:left;" rowspan=2| Olympiacos
| 31 || 1 || 16.6 || .398 || .299 || .760 || 2.4 || 1.0 || .5 || .1 || 5.8 || 4.8
|-
| style="text-align:left;"| 2013–14
| 22 || 10 || 20.2 || .458 || .462 || .850 || 2.8 || 1.2 || .7 || .0 || 9.9 || 9.2
|-
| style="text-align:left;"| 2014–15
| style="text-align:left;"| Anadolu Efes
| 27 || 20 || 23.9 || .387 || .344 || .868 || 3.7 || 1.3 || .9 || .2 || 9.8 || 9.2
|-
| style="text-align:left;"| 2015–16
| style="text-align:left;" rowspan=2|Barcelona
| 29 || 25 || 22.0 || .417 || .379 || .706 || 3.1 || 1.1 || .6 || .2 || 8.3 || 7.6
|-
| style="text-align:left;"| 2016–17
| 22 || 15 || 21.0 || .395 || .358 || .682 || 3.1 || 1.5 || .7 || .2 || 6.4 || 6.5
|- class="sortbottom"
|-
| style="text-align:left;"| 2019–20
| style="text-align:left;" rowspan=2|Crvena zvezda
| 13 || 0 || 16.3 || .400 || .357 || .727 || 2.6 || .5 || .5 || .3 || 7.8 || 5.2
|- class="sortbottom"
|-
| style="text-align:center;" | Career
| 222 || 124 || 18.4 || .450 || .371 || .761 || 2.6 || 1.1 || .7 || .2 || 7.1 || 5.9 
|-

Awards and accomplishments

Pro clubs
6× Greek League All-Star: (2007, 2008, 2009, 2010, 2011, 2014)
Greek League Best Five: (2007)
3× Greek Cup Winner: (2008, 2009, 2012)
4× Greek League Champion: (2008, 2009, 2010, 2011)
3× EuroLeague Champion: (2009, 2011, 2013)
Triple Crown Winner: (2009)
FIBA Intercontinental Cup Champion: (2013)
EuroLeague MVP of the Month: (December 2013)
Turkish Cup Winner: (2015)
Spanish Supercup Winner: (2015)
Adriatic Supercup Winner: (2018)
 All-Adriatic League Team (2019)
Adriatic League Champion: (2019)
Serbian League champion: (2019)

Greek junior national team
2002 FIBA Europe Under-18 Championship: 
2003 FIBA Under-19 World Cup:

Greek senior national team
2009 EuroBasket:

References

External links
 Stratos Perperoglou  at acb.com 
 Stratos Perperoglou at esake.gr 
 Stratos Perperoglou at eurobasket.com
 Stratos Perperoglou at euroleague.net
 Stratos Perperoglou at fiba.com
 Stratos Perperoglou at basket.gr 
 

1984 births
Living people
2010 FIBA World Championship players
ABA League players
Anadolu Efes S.K. players
FC Barcelona Bàsquet players
Greek Basket League players
Greek expatriate basketball people in Serbia
Greek expatriate basketball people in Spain
Greek expatriate basketball people in Israel
Greek expatriate basketball people in Turkey
Greek men's basketball players
Hapoel Jerusalem B.C. players
Ilysiakos B.C. players
KK Crvena zvezda players
Liga ACB players
Olympiacos B.C. players
Panathinaikos B.C. players
Panionios B.C. players
Sportspeople from Drama, Greece
Basketball players from Kavala
Power forwards (basketball)
Small forwards